Lake Monticello may refer to:

Lake Monticello, Virginia, a community and lake in Virginia
Lake Monticello (Arkansas), a man-made lake in Monticello, Arkansas
Lake Monticello (Texas), a lake in near Mount Pleasant, Texas
Monticello Lake, a lake near Monticello, Utah
Monticello Reservoir, in South Carolina